Eugene Migliaro Corporon is an American conductor, known for his work with wind ensembles and is a scholar of wind / band music repertoire. He is co-editor of two literature catalogs, Wind Ensemble/Band Repertoire (1984) and Wind Ensemble Literature (1975), as well as all ten volumes of the Teaching Music Through Performance in Band Series (GIA Publications). He also co-hosted the Inner Game of Music videotape.

Corporon and his various groups have recorded over 1,000 works on the Toshiba/EMI, Klavier Music Productions, Mark, Donemus, Soundmark, GIA, CAFUA, and Centaur labels.

Career 
Corporon is the conductor of the Wind Symphony and Regents Professor of Music at the University of North Texas. As Director of Wind Studies he guides all aspects of the program, including the masters and doctoral degrees in Wind Conducting. Corporon is a graduate of California State University, Long Beach and Claremont Graduate University. His performances have drawn praise from colleagues, composers and music critics alike.

Corporon began his career in 1969 as Director of Instrumental Music at Mount Miguel High School in Spring Valley, California.  He has held collegiate positions since 1971 which include California State University, Fullerton, the University of Wisconsin, the University of Northern Colorado, Michigan State University, the Cincinnati College-Conservatory of Music and the University of North Texas.

His ensembles have performed at the Midwest International Band and Orchestra Clinic, Southwestern Music Educators National Conference, Texas Music Educators Association Clinic/Convention, Texas Bandmasters Association Convention/Clinic, International Trumpet Guild Conference, International Clarinet Society Convention, North American Saxophone Alliance Conference, Percussive Arts Society International Convention, International Horn Society Conference, National Wind Ensemble Conference, College Band Directors National Association Conference, Japan Band Clinic, and the Conference for the World Association of Symphonic Bands and Ensembles. Having recorded over 1000 works, including many premieres and commissions, his groups have released more than 150 discs on the Toshiba/EMI, Klavier, Mark, CAFUA, Donemus, Soundmark, GIA, Albany, Naxos, and Centaur labels. These recordings, two of which have appeared on the Grammy nomination ballot, are aired regularly on radio broadcasts throughout Asia, Europe, and the Americas.

He is co-host with Barry Green on The Inner Game of Music video, which focuses on overcoming mental obstacles and achieving one’s full potential as a performer. He also appears with James Jordan on the DVD, The Anatomy of Conducting. He is co-author of the book Teaching Music Through Performance in Band which is published in ten volumes by GIA Publications. This series includes twenty sets of Resource Recordings by the North Texas Wind Symphony. The Teaching Music Project emphasizes the importance of comprehensive conceptual learning in the music-making process as well as the value of performing music of artistic significance.

Guest conductor

Corporon maintains an active guest-conducting schedule and is in demand as a conductor and teacher throughout the world. He is the Past President of the College Band Directors National Association and a member of the World Association for Symphonic Bands and Ensembles International Board. He has been honored by the American Bandmasters Association and by Phi Beta Mu with invitations to membership. Mr. Corporon, a frequent guest conductor at the Showa University of Music in Kawasaki City, Japan, has also served as a visiting conductor at the Juilliard School, the Interlochen World Center for Arts Education, and the Aspen Music Festival and School. He is also the principal conductor of the Lone Star Wind Orchestra, a professional group made up of musicians from the Dallas–Fort Worth Metroplex.

Author

He is author of the series Teaching Music Through Performance in Band which is published in ten volumes by GIA Publications. This series includes eighteen sets of Resource Recordings by the North Texas Wind Symphony. The Teaching Music Project emphasizes the importance of comprehensive conceptual learning in the music-making process as well as the value of performing music of artistic significance.

Awards and professional affiliations

Corporon is a recipient of the International Grainger Society Distinctive Contribution Medallion, the Kappa Kappa Psi Distinguished Service to Music Award, the Phi Beta Mu International Band Conductor of the Year Award as well as an Honorary Life Membership granted by the Texas Bandmasters Association. In addition to being inducted into the Music for All  Hall of Fame he has also received the Phi Mu Alpha Sinfonia National Citation for advancing the cause of music in America, the University of North Texas Student Government Association Honor Professor Award for Teaching Excellence, Student Rapport, and Scholarly Publications, the American School Band Directors Association A. A. Harding Award for making significant and lasting contributions to the school band movement, and the California State University, Long Beach, College of Fine Arts and Department of Music Distinguished Alumni Awards. He was awarded the Midwest Clinic Medal of Honor in 2015 to recognize his unique service to music education and continuing influence on the development and improvement of bands and orchestras worldwide.

Works 

 Reynolds, R. & Corporon, E. (1975) Wind Ensemble Literature University of Wisconsin–Madison.
 Wallace, D., & Corporon, E. (1984). Wind ensemble/band repertoire. Greeley, CO: University of Northern Colorado.

References

External links 
 College of Music at University of North Texas (Denton, Texas, United States)

American male conductors (music)
Aspen Music Festival and School faculty
University and college band directors
University of North Texas College of Music faculty
Living people
20th-century American conductors (music)
21st-century American conductors (music)
University of Cincinnati – College-Conservatory of Music faculty
Michigan State University faculty
University of Northern Colorado faculty
University of Wisconsin–Madison faculty
California State University, Fullerton faculty
1946 births
20th-century American male musicians
21st-century American male musicians